The earliest known life forms on Earth are believed to be fossilized microorganisms found in hydrothermal vent precipitates, considered to be about 3.42 billion years old. The earliest time for the origin of life on Earth is at least 3.77 billion years ago, possibly as early as 4.28 billion years ago—not long after the oceans formed 4.5 billion years ago, and after the formation of the Earth 4.54 billion years ago. The earliest direct evidence of life on Earth is from microfossils of microorganisms permineralized in 3.465-billion-year-old Australian Apex chert rocks.

Biosphere 

Earth remains the only place in the universe known to harbor life. The origin of life on Earth was at least 3.77 billion years ago, possibly as early as 4.28 billion years ago. Under certain test conditions, life forms have been observed to survive in the vacuum of outer space. More recently, in August 2020, bacteria were found to survive for three years in outer space, according to studies conducted on the International Space Station. In February 2023, findings of a "dark microbiome" of unfamiliar microorganisms in the Atacama Desert in Chile, a Mars-like region of planet Earth, were reported. The total mass of the biosphere has been estimated to be as much as 4 trillion tons of carbon. According to one researcher, "You can find microbes everywhere – [they are] extremely adaptable to conditions, and survive wherever they are."

Of all species of life forms that ever lived on Earth, over five billion, more than 99% are estimated to be extinct. Some estimates on the number of Earth's current species range from 10 million to 14 million, of which about 1.2 million have been documented and over 86 percent remain undescribed. However, a May 2016 scientific report estimates 1 trillion species currently on Earth, with only one-thousandth of one percent described. Additionally, there are an estimated 10 nonillion (10 to the 31st power) individual viruses (including the related virions) on Earth, the most numerous type of biological entity, which some biologists consider to be life forms.

Fossil evidence 

The age of Earth is about 4.54 billion years; the earliest undisputed evidence of life on Earth dates from at least 3.5 billion years ago. Some computer models suggest life began as early as 4.5 billion years ago. 

3.465-billion-year-old Australian Apex chert rocks may once have contained microorganisms, the earliest fossil evidence of life on Earth. Microbial mat fossils have been found in 3.48 billion-year-old sandstone in Western Australia. Evidence of biogenic graphite, and possibly stromatolites, were discovered in 3.7 billion-year-old metasedimentary rocks in southwestern Greenland. Potential "remains of life" were found in 4.1 billion-year-old rocks in Western Australia. "Putative filamentous microfossils", possibly of methanogens and/or methanotrophs, that lived about 3.42-billion-year-old in "a paleo-subseafloor hydrothermal vein system of the Barberton greenstone belt, have been identified in South Africa."

Fossilized microorganisms (microfossils) have been found in hydrothermal vent precipitates from an ancient sea-bed in the Nuvvuagittuq Belt of Quebec, Canada. These may be as old as 4.28 billion years, the oldest evidence of life on Earth, suggesting "an almost instantaneous emergence of life" after ocean formation 4.41 billion years ago. Some researchers even speculate that life may have started nearly 4.5 billion years ago. According to biologist Stephen Blair Hedges, "If life arose relatively quickly on Earth ... then it could be common in the universe". The possibility that terrestrial life forms may have been seeded from outer space has been considered. In January 2018, a study found that 4.5 billion-year-old meteorites found on Earth contained liquid water along with prebiotic complex organic substances that may be ingredients for life.

As for life on land, in 2019 scientists reported the discovery of a fossilized fungus, named Ourasphaira giraldae, in the Canadian Arctic, that may have grown on land a billion years ago, well before plants are thought to have been living on land. In July 2018, scientists reported that the earliest life on land may have been bacteria 3.22 billion years ago. In May 2017, evidence of microbial life on land may have been found in 3.48 billion-year-old geyserite in the Pilbara Craton of Western Australia.

Genomic evidence 

By comparing the genomes of modern organisms (in the domains Bacteria and Archaea), it is possible to infer the existence and age of the last universal common ancestor (LUCA), and a minimal set of genes. A molecular clock model suggests that the LUCA may have lived 4.477 to 4.519 billion years ago, within the Hadean eon.

Gallery

See also 

 Abiogenesis
 Extremophile
 Hypothetical types of biochemistry
 Oldest dated rocks
 Outline of biology
 Outline of life forms
 Timeline of the evolutionary history of life

Footnotes

References

External links 
 Vitae (BioLib)
 Biota (Taxonomicon)
 Life (Systema Naturae 2000)
 Wikispecies – a free directory of life
 Google Images: Earliest known life forms
 Life in the Universe – Stephen Hawking (1996)
  – Gary Ruvkun, 2019.

Biological evolution
Biology terminology
Earliest phenomena
Evolution